RRP1B (ribosomal RNA processing 1 homolog B), also known as KIAA0179, is a human gene which is located on Chromosome 21.

References

Further reading